Woodward Hall, also known as the Stone House, Earl Woodard House, and "Woodhill," is a historic home located in the town of Lake Luzerne in Warren County, New York.  It was built in 1931–1932, and is a two-story, rectangular building, five bays wide and two bays deep, with Tudor Revival and Colonial Revival style design elements in a somewhat eclectic design.  It has fieldstone walls and a cross-gable slate roof and sits on a poured concrete foundation.  It has a small, two-bay garage attached to the main block.  It was built for Earl Woodward (1891-1956), who reinvented Adirondack tourism in the Lake George region through the introduction of dude ranch style resorts during the 1920s.

It was listed on the National Register of Historic Places in 2014.

References

Houses on the National Register of Historic Places in New York (state)
Tudor Revival architecture in New York (state)
Colonial Revival architecture in New York (state)
Houses completed in 1932
Buildings and structures in Warren County, New York
National Register of Historic Places in Warren County, New York